Mandla Assembly constituency is one of the 230 Vidhan Sabha (Legislative Assembly) constituencies of Madhya Pradesh state in central India.

It is part of Mandla District.

Members of the Legislative Assembly

See also
Mandla

References

Assembly constituencies of Madhya Pradesh